, is a Japanese post, logistics and courier headquartered in Tokyo. It is part of the Japan Post Holdings group.

History 
Japan Post was formed on 1 October 2007 after the privatisation of its predecessor, Japan Post. On October 1, 2012, Japan Post Network was merged with Japan Post Service to form Japan Post Co., Ltd..

See also 
Japanese addressing system
Package delivery
Japanese postal mark
Japan Post Holdings - a holding company of Japan Post Group.
Japan Post

References

External links 
Japan Post (in Japanese)
Japan Post (in English)

Logistics companies of Japan
Postal organizations
Communications in Japan
Japan Post Holdings
Privately held companies of Japan
Japanese companies established in 2007
Transport companies established in 2007